The 2015–16 FC Mordovia Saransk season was the club's second season back in the Russian Premier League, the highest tier of football in Russia. It was their third season in the Russian Premier League having also participated in the 2012–13 season, before relegation back to the Russian National League.

Squad

Youth team

Transfers

Summer

In:

Out:

Winter

In:

Out:

Competitions

Russian Premier League

Results by round

Matches

League table

Russian Cup

Squad statistics

Appearances and goals

|-
|colspan="14"|Players away from the club on loan:
|-
|colspan="14"|Players who appeared for Mordovia Saransk no longer at the club:

|}

Goal Scorers

Disciplinary Record

References

FC Mordovia Saransk seasons
Mordovia Saransk